The Poland men's national under-23 volleyball team is the men's national under-23 volleyball team of Poland. The team is controlled by the Polski Związek Piłki Siatkowej (PZPS), which represents the country in international competitions - FIVB U23 World Championships.

History
Polish national under-23 team qualified to 2017 FIVB U23 World Championship on August 1, 2016. The national team led by Wojciech Serafin, won all matches in qualification tournament. In 2017, the national under-23 team was taken by Dariusz Daszkiewicz. They won their debut match in World Championship on August 18, 2017 against Cuba (4–1).

International competitions

U23 World Championship
2013 to 2015 — did not participate
  2017 Egypt — 9th place
Firlej, Semeniuk, Komenda, Halaba, Depowski, Zwiech, Lipiński, Formela, Szymura, Kania, Czunkiewicz, Mucha. Head coach: Daszkiewicz

Team
Updated: 18 August 2017

Represent Poland U23 at 2017 FIVB U23 World Championship:

References

External links
Official website

See also
 Poland men's national U19 volleyball team
 Poland men's national U21 volleyball team
 Poland men's national volleyball team

National men's under-23 volleyball teams
National team U23
National team U23
Men's sport in Poland
Youth sport in Poland